Cochlodina cerata is a species of air-breathing land snail in the terrestrial pulmonate gastropod mollusk family Clausiliidae, the door snails, all of which have a clausilium.

Subspecies 
Subspecies within this species include:
 Cochlodina cerata opaviensis Brabenec & Mácha, 1960

Distribution 
This species occurs in the Carpathians, from Slovakia and northeastern Hungary to northern Romania.

References

Clausiliidae
Gastropods described in 1836